"Stressed Out" is a song written and recorded by American musical duo Twenty One Pilots. It was released as a promotional single from their fourth studio album, Blurryface (2015). Produced by Mike Elizondo and recorded at studios in Los Angeles and London, it was released as a promotional single via Fueled by Ramen on April 28, 2015. The song later impacted contemporary hit radio stations as the album's fourth official single on November 10. Elizondo initially took issue with the nature of the song's lyrical content, but relaxed after lead vocalist and songwriter Tyler Joseph explained the larger album concept.

"Stressed Out" is a midtempo alternative hip hop, Alternative rock and rap rock song with elements of rock and Psychedelic music. The track is built from synths and a Caribbean-style keyboard line alongside rapping vocals by Joseph. Lyrically, it addresses the harsh end of adolescence. The song is an ode that harbors a downbeat atmosphere and lyrics speaking on transitioning from adolescence to adulthood and nostalgia for the innocence of childhood. The lyrics touch on insecurities and address millennial angst while discussing life challenges. Throughout the song, Joseph personifies the album's titular character, Blurryface, whose self-deprecating lyrics express self-doubt and anxiety, stressing over personal issues ranging from his music to the idea of becoming an adult.

"Stressed Out" led Twenty One Pilots to become the first rock act to have a single song reach 1 billion streams on Spotify. Upon its release, it received favorable reviews from contemporary music critics. The song was a sleeper hit, peaking at No. 2 on the US Billboard Hot 100, giving the duo their first top 10 hit in the US. The song topped the US Billboard Hot Rock Songs for a record 23 weeks. It also peaked at No. 1 on the Billboard Adult Top 40, Rock Airplay, and Mainstream Top 40. "Stressed Out" was certified Diamond by the Recording Industry Association of America (RIAA) for sales of over 10,000,000 copies. The song reached the top five of record charts in Australia, Austria, Belgium, Canada, the Czech Republic, Ecuador, France, Germany, Ireland, Israel, Mexico, the Netherlands, New Zealand, Portugal, Russia, Slovakia, and Switzerland.

An accompanying music video for the single was directed by Eshleman and mostly filmed at drummer Josh Dun's home in Columbus, Ohio. It features a mixture of surreal visuals and existential scenes while portraying the duo riding tricycles for a playdate and attempting to relive their childhood. In the music video, black paint can be seen on the neck and hands of Joseph, referencing the character Blurryface. At the 59th Annual Grammy Awards, "Stressed Out" was nominated for Record of the Year and Best Pop Duo/Group Performance, winning the latter.

Background and recording

During the promotion of their forthcoming studio album, Joseph began wearing black paint in every video and live performance. Both the lyrics of "Stressed Out" as well as the paint reference the name and titular character of their album, Blurryface (2015). "Stressed Out" musically acts as an introduction to the alter ego of "Blurryface" with its haunting refrain. His identity rises to surface during the song's nursery-rhyme pre-chorus refrain, where he sings, "My name's 'Blurryface' and I care what you think." 

The thematic elements of the duo's second major-label studio album and identity of Blurryface and come into focus on "Stressed Out". Their loose concept album had been about Joseph attempting to defeat the alter ego of the titular monster-image representing his insecurities and self-hatreds. An emphasis is placed on the concept of the character, who manifests within "Stressed Out" as well as throughout their studio album and appeared in its promotional campaign. In an interview with MTV News, Joseph elaborated, "It's a guy that kind of represents all the things that I as an individual — but also everyone around me — am insecure about. When I think about insecurities and my insecurities are getting the best of me, the things that I think of are kind of a feeling of suffocation and then also the things that I create with my hands... Very dramatic, I know, but it helps me get into that character".

"Stressed Out" was written by Joseph from the perspective of the character Blurryface rather than some impersonal third-person narrator. His lyricism is filled with couplets and one-line rhyme schemes pertaining to definitive generational concerns. Tyler Joseph was in his mid-20s at time of the single's release. He was speaking as a member of generation engulfed in college loan debt and sharing their anxieties while feigning apathy and yearning peer acceptance all over social media. For a time, record producer Mike Elizondo was worried Joseph's specificity would limit the single's reception among the larger populace. In retrospect, Elizondo said, "We can all kind of relate to wanting to have more of those simpler days. I think he nailed it; though the lyrical content is very specific to him, the listener is able to impose their own story onto it. That type of feeling will never go away."

"Stressed Out" was produced by Mike Elizondo and recorded at Can Am in Los Angeles, California and at Livingston Studios in London, England. The track was then mixed at the Casita in Hollywood, California. During its recording, Elizondo had but one grievance in regards to the song. Speaking with front-man and principal songwriter Tyler Joseph, he opined that to the average listener, its lyrical content came off as esoteric. Elizondo recalled, "So I had a good conversation with him trying to say, 'Hey, maybe you should change that; it's a great melody, it's a big hook of the song, but I just don't know what it means." He soon relaxed on the issue after Joseph provided an explanation of the larger album concept.

Composition
"Stressed Out" is a mid-tempo alternative hip hop, alternative rock and rap rock song that runs for a duration of three minutes and twenty-two seconds. The musical composition has a throwback to rock music and psychedelic pop while maintaining clear pop sensibilities. According to the sheet music published at Musicnotes.com by Alfred Music, it is written in the time signature of common time, with a moderate tempo of 85 beats per minute. "Stressed Out" is composed in the key of A minor, while Tyler Joseph's vocal range spans one octave and four notes, from a low of E3 to a high of A4. The song has a basic sequence of F–Dm–Am in the verses, pre-chorus and outro, changes to Am–G–C–E at the refrain and follows Am–G–C5–E during the bridge as its chord progression. 

Opening with its drumbeat, the linear musical arrangement is structured around the phrase, "My name is Blurryface and I care what you think." The track is built from wobbly synths, a Caribbean style keyboard line and rapped vocals by Tyler Joseph. The song is punctuated by brief bursts of string section and synths as well as eerie, theremin-like sounds that underscore his vocals. During its verses, Joseph recites deceptively simple lyrics atop the track's earworm beat. Joseph's rapping has him delivering confessional lines in a conversational tone. Following its refrain, the eerie melody precedes the second verse. The musical composition has downbeat atmosphere, with lyrical content focusing on personal themes. 

Lyrically, "Stressed Out" is about the harsh end of adolescence. The song is an ode with lyrics speaking on the transition from adolescence to adulthood and nostalgia for the innocence of childhood. They touch on adolescent insecurity and address millennial angst while discussing relatable life challenges. Joseph's self-deprecating lyrics express anxiety over everything from his music to growing older. His poignant lyrics convey a narrative illustrating young men who discover that life as an adult is plagued with issues. Throughout the track, Joseph personifies the parent album's titular character, "Blurryface." He is a character within a story who represents Joseph's self-doubt and insecurities. At the song's pre-chorus, he sings, "My name's 'Blurryface' and I care what you think." Blurryfaces insecurities lies in the idea of growing up and becoming an adult. He sings about the desire to return to "the good 'ol days" and the tree houses of their carefree youth. His voice pines for a time prior to stress of reality, such as student loans and the pressure to get a job and find success. During the chorus, Joseph chants, "Wish we could turn back time /to the good old days/when our mom would sing us to sleep/but now we're stressed out." The song closes with an outro where external voices suggest the need to wake up because they need to make money.

Critical reception
Jia Tolentino of The New Yorker stated the song's chorus is as "bright as its minor key will allow". Philip Cosores and the staff of Consequence mentioned the song "resonates with listeners, as the two sing about 'the good 'ol days' before the stress of reality set in". Randy Holmes for ABC News Radio described the track as a "multi-genre breakout hit", while Madison Desler of the Orange County Register called it a "monster hit". Rachel Aroesti for The Guardian said "Stressed Out" is a "mode that is both evergreen and all the rage". Larry Fitzmaurice of Vulture opined the track is "arguably the most noxious quality of Twenty One Pilots' sound—front and center". The Sydney Morning Herald critic George Palathingal deemed the song as "catchy", and "essentially inoffensive". Tampa Bay Times Jay Cridlin lauded it as an "arena-shaking hit". Molly Lambert of MTV wrote that the song "has a haunted, music-hall feeling, and a slightly embarrassing but highly effective earnestness in its longing for a romanticized, innocent past". She continued, saying it "genuinely stressed me out at first, with its herky-jerk from the verses into the chorus, but I eventually found myself constantly sing[ing] [it]".

Critic Cole Waterman of Spectrum Culture called "Stressed Out" one of the album's best songs. The staff of Loudwire said that while they were listening to the songs lyrics, it was "not hard to see why the song has resonated with so many music fans". Peter Sblendorio from New York Daily News considered the song a "radio staple". Writing for The Salt Lake Tribune, Sean P. Means felt that the song is "nostalgia-tinged". Andja Curcic of Renowned for Sound commented that it "places an importance on lyrics that look at the transition from adolescence to adulthood". The Oregonian reviewer Troy L. Smith felt that the song hit a "radio-friendly sweet spot". Variety Chris Willman stated the "mortal concerns" of Twenty One Pilots 2018 album Trench makes him feel "a little nostalgic", and wanted some of the "in-your-face youth angst of 'Stressed Out'". In her review for The New York Times, Caryn Ganz called the song an "anxiety anthem" and mentioned it is known for its "sing-songy chorus". Chris Deville of Stereogum considered it as the "probably the most linear" song the group has made, and said it still manages to merge Sublime, Portishead, and ASAP Rocky. Slates Carl Wilson criticized the song, stating the song's refrain is "menacingly flat and paranoiacally self-conscious in affect".

Retrospectively, critics have considered "Stressed Out" one of Twenty One Pilots' best songs. Jason Pettigrew of Alternative Press called it a "diamond" and stated "Gen X boredom gives way to exasperated millennial neurosis" during the track. Bryony Symes from Louder Sound opined that "Stressed Out" is the group's best song to date and that the "kind of complex melody, with its slew of catchy hooks, that will get caught in a loop in your head, and have you humming along for hours after you’ve heard it". Writing for Cleveland.com, Anne Nickoloff and Troy Smith mentioned it was "going to be a hit right from the opening beat" and that it is as "pure of a rap-rock song the band has written, but its pop sensibility is clear. Even Tyler Joseph's self-deprecating lyrics couldn't slow its momentum". Sam Law for Kerrang! deemed the track is a "pop culture changing of the guard fading the disenfranchisement of Generation X into the neuroses of their millennial successors, deceptively simple lyrics". He continued, depicting it "feels judderingly relevant but also destined to live forever". In 2018, Louder Sound ranked the song number one on their list of the 10 greatest Twenty One Pilots songs, and in 2020, Kerrang ranked the song number three on their list of the 20 greatest Twenty One Pilots songs.

Accolades
"Stressed Out" was nominated for Top Rock song at both the 2016 Billboard Music Awards and 2017 Billboard Music Awards. It was nominated for Choice Rock Song and Choice Song: Group at the 2016 Teen Choice Awards. The song won Alternative Rock Song of the Year	at the 2016 iHeartRadio Music Awards, and was also nominated for Song of the Year at the 2017 iHeartRadio Music Awards. At the 59th Annual Grammy Awards, "Stressed Out" was nominated for Record of the Year and Best Pop Duo/Group Performance, winning the latter.

Release and commercial performance
"Stressed Out" was first released as a promotional single through Fueled by Ramen on April 28, 2015, on the Google Play Store and Amazon, It was later added as the second track on Twenty One Pilots' fourth studio album Blurryface on May 17, 2015. The song was issued to Contemporary hit radio stations as the album's fourth official single on November 10, 2015. "Stressed Out" became the first rock song to surpass one billion streams on Spotify.

"Stressed Out" debuted at number 87 on the US Billboard Hot 100 on the chart dated May 16, 2015. The song later rose from number 45 to number 28 on the chart dated December 17, 2015, giving Twenty One Pilots their first top 40 hit in the United States. Although it was released in 2015, "Stressed Out" did not truly take off and gradually find widespread breakthrough success until the following year. On the chart dated January 16, 2016, "Stressed Out" rose from number 13 to number nine, giving the group their first top-10 hit in the US. A month later, the song rose from number four and reached its peak of number two, being blocked from reaching number one by Canadian singer Justin Bieber's 2015 single "Love Yourself". At the time, Twenty One Pilots earned three top-10 hits: "Stressed Out", "Ride", and "Heathens", joining American electronic DJ and production duo The Chainsmokers as the only ones to have three or more top-10 hits on the Hot 100 in 2016. It ranked at number five on the 2016 Hot 100 year-end list.

"Stressed Out" debuted at number one on the Billboard Hot Rock Songs chart, giving Twenty One Pilots their first number one hit on the chart. The song spent a record 23 weeks at number one on the Hot Rock Songs. It also peaked at number one on the Billboard airplay charts: Adult Top 40, Rock Airplay, and Mainstream Top 40. On April 30, 2021, the single was certified a diamond certification by the Recording Industry Association of America (RIAA), denoting track-equivalent sales of 10,000,000 units in the US based on sales and streams. In March 2021, years after "Stressed Out" was released, it peaked at number 182 on the Billboard Global 200. The song peaked at number one in record charts of Russia and Mexico. It peaked within the top five in Australia, Austria, the Belgium Flanders chart, Canada, Czech Republic, Ecuador, France, Germany, Ireland, Israel, the Netherlands, New Zealand, Portugal, Slovakia, and Switzerland. According to the International Federation of the Phonographic Industry (IFPI), "Stressed Out" was the tenth best-performing single of 2016, with 9.9 million units combined sales and track-equivalent streams worldwide.

Music video

Background and synopsis
Upon Blurryface release, Twenty One Pilots had been touring for a long time. When it was time to make a music video for "Stressed Out", the group had been feeling homesick from excessive touring. Eshleman arranged a time for the group to return to their hometown of Columbus, Ohio to shoot the video and finally be with their loved one. Most of the video was shot at Dun's childhood home, subsequently making it a destination for fans of Twenty One Pilots to visit. Dun said his parents have since had to cancel their landline telephone service in order to stop calls coming in at all hours because their home number was listed in the video. The surrealistic video retains a mixture of existential sequences and draws visual cues from fairy tales such as Alice in Wonderland. They follow a theme of the desire to forever remain a child forever in his family home to taking a journey into a disorienting environment. 

Twenty One Pilots released the video for "Stressed Out" on April 27, 2015, and it was directed by Reel Bear Media. The video depicts a bleak narrative set in a dreary suburban neighborhood. The story begins on a partly cloudy day with Joseph pedalling down a street on a three wheeler. Throughout the music video, black paint can be seen on his neck and hands. Joseph arrives at a house and goes inside. He enters a bedroom where Dun is waiting for him. The two perform the song with a young man who lives there, and within the mind of the young man dwelling inside the house who resembles the two save their tattoos and colored hair. At one point, the pair drink Capri Suns while sitting near a curb. The scene then changes to Joseph and Dun lying in beds as members from their combined families who are dressed in black watch them sleep and all chant in unison "Wake up, you need to make money".

Reception
Writing for Diffuser, Michael Haskoor descried it as a "perfectly paired visual", and said it is way more "minimalist than their video for the explosive "Tear in My Heart" and seems to fit well with the song's chorus". Courtney E. Smith of Radio.com compared the visual to Scottish novelist J. M. Barrie's 1904 play Peter Pan, or The Boy Who Wouldn't Grow Up, while Brenna Enrlich of MTV News compared it to the works of American rock band Blink-182 and stated the video is about "growing up and being an adult and whatnot. I think we can all relate to that". Cassie Whitt from Alternative Press opined it is a "sentiment any recent entrant into adulthood can relate". The music received a nomination for Best Music Video at the 2016 Alternative Press Music Awards. It was also nominated for Favorite Music Video at the 2017 Kids' Choice Awards.

Live performances
"Stressed Out" has since become a fan favorite at live concert venues. Twenty One Pilots performed "Stressed Out" on Late Night with Seth Meyers on September 21, 2015. Twenty One Pilots performed "Stressed Out" on their 2016 Emotional Roadshow World Tour in Ohio; Tyler Joseph changed the lyrics of the first verse. In the changed lyrics, he talked about how he thought the song was overplayed, and the success of the song. Twenty One Pilots performed the song during a concert at the UNSW Roundhouse in Sydney, Australia on April 20, 2016. After opening with a performance of Heavydirtysoul, the duo segued into a live rendition of Stressed Out. An unmasked Tyler Joseph rested behind a piano, moving to the melodic bounce of the track.

Track listing

Personnel
Credits adapted from Blurryface liner notes.

 Tyler Josephvocals, piano, programming, synthesizers, keyboards
 Josh Dundrums, percussion
 Mike Elizondoupright bass, keyboards, programming
 Adam Hawkinsengineering 
 Neal Avronmixing engineer
 Scott Skrzynskiassistant mixing engineer
 Chris Gehringermastering engineer

Charts

Weekly charts

Year-end charts

Decade-end charts

Certifications

Release history

See also
 List of best-selling singles in the United States
 List of Hot Rock & Alternative Songs number ones
 List of Billboard Mainstream Top 40 number-one songs of 2016
 List of most-streamed songs on Spotify

References

External links

2015 songs
2015 singles
Monitor Latino Top General number-one singles
Number-one singles in Poland
Grammy Award for Best Pop Duo/Group Performance
Fueled by Ramen singles
Song recordings produced by Mike Elizondo
Songs written by Tyler Joseph
Twenty One Pilots songs
Alternative hip hop songs
Rap rock songs
Psychedelic pop songs
Trying to prevent adulthood in popular culture
Songs about nostalgia
Songs about childhood
Songs about fictional characters